The 1947 Satipo earthquake occurred on November 1 at 09:58:57 local time with an epicenter in the Peruvian Amazon jungle in the Department of Junín. The earthquake has an estimated moment magnitude of 7.7 and a shallow focal depth of 20 km.

The earthquake produced 45 to 60 seconds of violent ground shaking in the Department of Junín, and was felt by many individuals within a 1.3-million-square-kilometer area. A maximum Modified Mercalli intensity of VIII (Severe) to IX (Violent) was assigned to an area estimated to be 4,000 km² in size. The peak ground acceleration was calculated at 309 mm/s² in Satipo, based on evaluating the damage to a brick pilar. In the city of Lima, 240 km from the epicenter, the earthquake caused light to weak shaking corresponding to IV (Light) or III (Weak).

An aerial survey over the affected area found a large number of small-scale landslides and destroyed vegetation near the Satipo River. Parts of a highway were buried under landslide debris. Approximately 233–2,233 people in Satipo Province lost their lives during the earthquake.

The earthquake destroyed or seriously damaged 63 percent of all adobe constructed homes in La Merced. Another 36 percent of homes had moderate damage, while the remaining 1 percent were undamaged. Most reinforced concrete homes withstood the earthquake shaking, although some were reportedly cracked. At least half of all limestone buildings were destroyed. In Satipo, the earthquake collapsed an entire school complex.

See also
List of earthquakes in 1947
List of earthquakes in Peru

References

1947 earthquakes
Earthquakes in Peru
1947 in Peru
1947 disasters in Peru